Steve Urie was a member of the Arizona House of Representatives, representing Arizona's 22nd District from January 2011 until January 2013. Prior to serving in the state legislature, Urie was a member of the Gilbert, Arizona town council from 1999 to 2007. During his tenure there he served as the vice-mayor from 2002 to 2003.

References

Republican Party members of the Arizona House of Representatives
Living people
Year of birth missing (living people)
People from Gilbert, Arizona
Deputy mayors